Micrelenchus burchorum is a species of sea snail, a marine gastropod mollusk in the family Trochidae, the top snails.

Description
The height of the shell attains 26 mm, its diameter 16 mm.

Distribution
This marine species is endemic to New Zealand and occurs off Three Kings Islands

References

 Marshall B.A. 1998. The New Zealand Recent species of Cantharidus Montfort, 1810 and Micrelenchus Finlay, 1926 (Mollusca: Gastropoda: Trochidae). Molluscan Research 19(1): 107–156

burchorum
Gastropods of New Zealand
Gastropods described in 1998